A. asiatica may refer to:
 Agriades asiatica, the azure mountain blue, a small butterfly species found in the Himalayas
 Amelanchier asiatica, the Asian serviceberry, a shrub species
 Anumeta asiatica, a moth species found in the Middle East
 Artemisia asiatica (disambiguation), two plant species

See also
 List of Latin and Greek words commonly used in systematic names#Asiatica